The Bedia are a community in India. They believe that they originally lived on Mohdipahar of Hazaribagh district and have descended from the union of Vedbansi prince with a Munda girl. The other view is that a section of the Kudmis were outcastes and came to be known as the Bedia or Wandering Kudmis.

Origin 
The word bedia is a corrupt form of the Hindi word behara, which means a forest dweller. They are a nomadic tribe, that had been notified under the Criminal Tribes Act. According to early British scholars, they were one of the many nomadic tribes found in North India, and were of the same stock as the Rajputs. According to their own traditions, they were originally Rajputs, who lost status, after their defeat at the hands of the Mughals. The community was connected with some bad works, as well as petty theft. They speak Awadhi and are found mainly in the districts of Bahraich, Barabanki, Basti, Agra, Faizabad, Gonda and Kanpur. After independence, they were denotified in 1952, when the Criminal Tribes Act was repealed.

Present circumstances 
The Bedia who have settled down in West Bengal, are also known as the Bedia Kudmi, Choto Kudmi or San Kudmi. They speak in Kurmali, an Indo-Aryan language, at home and Bengali for inter-group communication. The Bengali and Devanagari scripts are used.

The Bedia are divided into three territorial groupings, the Nathotiya, Jogiara, and Gangaparia. Each of these groups is strictly endogamous. There is also a further division between those who still follow their traditional occupation of bad works and those who are now settled agriculturists. They have numbers of exogamous clans such as Pecha (owl), Mahua (Madhuca India), Suia (parrot), Kachhua (tortoise), Chidra (squirrel) etc. Their deity are Bad Pahari and Palcharu. They celebrate festivals such as Jitiya, Sohrai, Fagun, Sarhul.

A number of Bedia have given up their nomadic lifestyle, and are now settled agriculturists. However, the majority are mainly sharecroppers and agricultural labourers. They live in multi-caste villages. Each of their settlements contains a formal caste council known as biradari panchayat. The panchayat resolves most intra-community disputes. These biradari panchayats are each headed by a headman known as a Mahato. The position of the chaudhary is hereditary, and these families exercise considerable influence over the community.

The 2011 Census of India for Uttar Pradesh, where they were classified as a Scheduled Caste under the name Beriya, showed their population as 46,775. In Jharkhand, they are listed as Scheduled Tribe.

References

 

Scheduled Castes of Uttar Pradesh
Social groups of West Bengal
Social groups of Bihar
Social groups of Jharkhand
Denotified tribes of India